Thomas William Burgess (15 June 1872 – 2 July 1950) was the second person to successfully complete a swim of the English Channel after Matthew Webb. He performed the feat on 6 September 1911, on his 16th attempt. British by nationality, Burgess spent most of his life in France, and won a bronze medal with the French water polo team at the 1900 Olympics.

In 1926 he coached Gertrude Ederle who became the first woman to swim the English Channel.

Early life and education

Burgess was born at 7 Lyndhurst Place, Rotherham, to Alfred Burgess, a blacksmith from Youlgreave, Derbyshire, and Camilla Anna Peat, a cook from Harthill, South Yorkshire. He had a younger sister, Winifred Edith Burgess, who was born in Rotherham on 11 May 1875. Their father worked for the Earl of Shrewsbury and accepted the Earl's offer to run a branch of the business, Shrewsbury and Challinor Rubber Company, in London. The family moved to Westminster, London, around 1882. During this time, Burgess joined a swimming club and swam to Battersea along the Thames.

Career
Around 1889 the 20th Earl of Shrewsbury offered Burgess the opportunity to set up a French branch of the Shrewsbury and Challinor Rubber Company motor tyre business in Paris. Burgess accepted and moved to France, where he spent the rest of his life.

On 8 August 1893 Burgess married Anne Rosalie Mioux, a French woman, in Neuilly-Sur-Seine in Paris, and lived with her, running a motor business in Levallois-Perret. They had two children, a son born in 1896 and a daughter born in Paris in 1907. It is believed that the son fought for the British in World War I with the York and Lancaster Regiment. Burgess' maternal uncle was a head teacher at a school in Swinton, South Yorkshire. Burgess' sister married in London and her daughter, Phyllis Camilla Ruegg, became the head of an Educational college in London and died at the age of 98 in Camden 1996.

1900 Olympic Games
Burgess competed in swimming and water polo at the 1900 Olympics held in Paris and won a bronze medal playing for the French team despite his British nationality, which was allowed by the rules at that time. In swimming, he finished fourth in the 4000m freestyle and fifth in the 200m backstroke events.

Cross Channel swim
On 6 September 1911, on his 16th attempt, Burgess became the second person to swim across the English Channel, and the first one to use goggles. His motorcycle goggles leaked water, but they protected his eyes from water splashes during his breaststroke-only swim. 

King George V wrote:"I am commanded to convey to you the hearty congratulations of the King upon your determinaion and endurance in accomplishing the wonderful feat of swimming the Channel today." 

Burgess replied: "''Your majesty's gracious message has touched me deeply. Its receipt has given me more pleasure than the accomplishment of the feat itself. I am proud to be an Englishman and your subject.."

Gertrude Ederle
In the 1920s Burgess was hired by the Olympian gold medalist and world record holder Gertrude Ederle, who in 1926, under his guidance, became the first woman to cross the English Channel. Around the same time Burgess bought a summer home at Cap Gris Nez near Calais, as a summer base to train channel swimmers from 1922 to 1934, while his main residence was at Clichy, Paris.

World War 2
In 1941 Burgess was taken prisoner by the Nazis and held in a prison camp Frontstalag 142 in Besançon, France. He was released later the same year.

See also
 List of Olympic medalists in water polo (men)

References

External links
 

1872 births
1950 deaths
English Channel swimmers
Male long-distance swimmers
Olympic medalists in water polo
English male water polo players
Olympic swimmers of Great Britain
Olympic bronze medalists for France
Olympic water polo players of Great Britain
Medalists at the 1900 Summer Olympics
Swimmers at the 1900 Summer Olympics
Water polo players at the 1900 Summer Olympics
Sportspeople from Rotherham
British emigrants to France
English male freestyle swimmers
British male backstroke swimmers